Tara Ruttledge (born 1991) is a camogie player, a member of the Galway senior panel that unsuccessfully contested the All Ireland finals of 2010 and 2011 against Wexford, She was an All-Star nominee in 2010.

Other awards
All Ireland Intermediate medal 2009, Galway Minor Player of the Year 2008. Under 14, Minor and Junior Club titles, five Connacht Schools.

References

External links
 Camogie.ie Official Camogie Association Website

1991 births
Living people
Galway camogie players